Waves is the third album by Welsh singer Rhydian. It was released on 1 August 2011 in the United Kingdom. It entered the UK Albums Chart at number 39 on 7 August 2011. The album is a complete departure from Rhydian's first two albums, which were operatic pop to more electronic sound with elements of new wave.

Track listing

Chart performance

Release history

References

External links
 Official Website

2011 albums
New wave albums by Welsh artists